The 2001 EuroTel Slovak Indoors was a women's tennis tournament played on indoor hard courts in Bratislava, Slovakia that was part of the Tier V category of the 2001 WTA Tour. It was the third edition of the tournament and was held from 15 October until 21 October 2001. Fourth-seeded Rita Grande won the singles title and earned $16,000 first-prize money.

Finals

Singles

 Rita Grande defeated  Martina Suchá, 6–1, 6–1
 It was Grande's second singles title of the year and of her career.

Doubles

 Dája Bedáňová /  Elena Bovina defeated  Nathalie Dechy /  Meilen Tu, 6–3, 6–4

References

External links
 ITF tournament edition details
 Tournament draws

WTA Bratislava
2001 in Slovak women's sport
2001 in Slovak tennis